Under Secretary of State (U/S) is a title used by senior officials of the United States Department of State who rank above the Assistant Secretaries and below the Deputy Secretary.

From 1919 to 1972, the Under Secretary was the second-ranking official at the Department of State (immediately beneath the United States Secretary of State), serving as the Secretary's principal deputy, chief assistant, and Acting Secretary in the event of the Secretary's absence. Prior second-ranking positions had been the Chief Clerk, the Assistant Secretary of State, and the Counselor. Prior to 1944, a number of offices in the Department reported directly to the Under Secretary. In July 1972, the position of Deputy Secretary superseded that of Under Secretary of State.

The following is a list of current offices bearing the title of "Under Secretary of State":

 Under Secretary of State for Political Affairs
 Under Secretary of State for Management
 Under Secretary of State for Economic Growth, Energy, and the Environment
 Under Secretary of State for Arms Control and International Security Affairs
 Under Secretary of State for Public Diplomacy and Public Affairs 
 Under Secretary of State for Civilian Security, Democracy, and Human Rights

In addition to the six Under Secretaries, the Counselor of the Department, who advises the Secretary of State, holds a rank equivalent to Under Secretary.

Current Under Secretaries of State

Under Secretaries of State, 1919–1972

See also 

 List of undersecretary positions
 Undersecretary

References

External links
The Department of State's list of Under Secretaries in the period that it was the second-ranking position.
The Department of State's list of former and current positions.

 
United States Department of State
United States diplomacy